Mehrdad Pooladi (born 26 February 1987) is an Iranian professional footballer. He was also an Iranian international, where he played as a left back.

Pooladi is a utility player, formerly playing as a forward and attacking midfielder in his youth and playing regularly as a full back, defensive midfielder and winger.

Club career

Esteghlal
In August 2007, Pooladi moved from Paykan to Esteghlal as one of the number of young players that were chosen by coach Naser Hejazi. He scored his only goal in Estghlal's 2–1 away at Moghavemat Sepasi. After Hejazi was sacked and replaced with Firouz Karimi, he fell down in the pecking order and eventually left Esteghlal two years after joining the team.

Tractor Sazi
Pooladi joined Tractor Sazi for the 2008–09 season where he played only for a single season. In Tabriz he managed to regain his form playing mostly as a central midfielder, scoring six goals in the season. The most noteworthy was a 40-yard free-kick against his former team Esteghlal in the Azadi Stadium.

Mes Kerman
Pooladi transferred to Mes Kerman and played for the team for a year and a half, again mostly as a midfielder. In the mid-season of 2011–12, he was not included in Miroslav Blažević's squad and left the team.

Persepolis
In January 2012 Pooladi moved to Persepolis, Pooladi could not play in 2011–12 season as he had missed the transfer deadline day. He was however able to register for the 2012 AFC Champions League playing in 7 games and scoring a goal against Al-Shabab from a free-kick in a 3–1 win. He extended his contract with Persepolis for two years, keeping him in the team until 2014. 
He has established himself as a fan favorite due to the high intensity at which he plays the game. Since he joined Persepolis he played the majority of the games as a left back, occasionally slotting in as a defensive midfielder and left wing. After a good showing in the 2014 FIFA World Cup, he was monitored by Premier League clubs such as Southampton, Hull City and Swansea City. On 17 September 2014, the FFIRI disciplinary committee announced a sentence on his contract with Persepolis for the forthcoming 2014–15 season due to conscription issues. According to this sentence, the contract is cancelled after the end of the 2013–14 season (in May 2014), therefore he became a free agent and was free to choose his club.

Al-Shahania
Pooladi officially joined coach Miguel Ángel Lotina's Qatari side Al-Shahania with a two-year contract after IFF's rule that he is a free agent due to conscription issues. On 5 December 2014, he provided an assist to Masoud Shojaei. He also scored a 35–yard free kick for them towards the end of the season.

Bangkok United
In June 2017, Pooladi joined Bangkok United Football Club - a Thai professional football club based in Pathum Thani.

International career

Pooladi played all three games for Iran U20 at 2006 AFC Youth Championship, as a product of Paykan Tehran. He also made five appearances in 2005 in Valentin A.Granatkin Memorial – International Youth Tournament for Iran U20.
He was also a member of Iran U-23, participating in the 2006 Asian Games.

He started his senior international career under Carlos Queiroz in July 2011 against Madagascar. Queiroz moved Pooladi to the left back position a position and Pooladi has taken the opportunity and established himself as first choice left back ever since.

2014 FIFA World Cup
On 1 June 2014, he was called into Iran's 2014 FIFA World Cup squad by Carlos Queiroz. Pooladi was named as the second best-ranked player in the first week of the tournament behind Thomas Müller by FIFA, after receiving 9.7 points in the opening match against Nigeria. He also showed a good performance in the next match against Argentina. In second half time he dribbled well Higuain and Messi to shows his technical ability

2015 Asian Cup
He was called into Iran's 2015 AFC Asian Cup squad on 30 December 2014 by Carlos Queiroz. On 23 January 2015, he received a controversial red card in the quarter-final match of the 2015 AFC Asian Cup against Iraq by referee Ben Williams.

Career statistics

Honours
Esteghlal
Iran Pro League: 2008–09
Hazfi Cup: 2007–08

Persepolis
Iran Pro League: Runner-up 2013–14

References

External links
Mehrdad Pooladi at PersianLeague.com
Mehrdad Pooladi at TeamMelli.com

1987 births
Living people
Iranian footballers
Association football midfielders
Iran international footballers
Iranian expatriate footballers
Association football utility players
Asian Games bronze medalists for Iran
Paykan F.C. players
Esteghlal F.C. players
Tractor S.C. players
Sanat Mes Kerman F.C. players
Persepolis F.C. players
Al-Shahania SC players
Mehrdad Pooladi
Al Kharaitiyat SC players
Muaither SC players
Persian Gulf Pro League players
Qatar Stars League players
Qatari Second Division players
2014 FIFA World Cup players
2015 AFC Asian Cup players
People from Karaj
Asian Games medalists in football
Footballers at the 2006 Asian Games
Medalists at the 2006 Asian Games
Iranian expatriate sportspeople in Thailand
Iranian expatriate sportspeople in Qatar
Expatriate footballers in Thailand
Expatriate footballers in Qatar